The NATO A band is the obsolete designation given to the radio frequencies from 0 to 250 MHz (equivalent to wavelengths from 1.2 m upwards) during the cold war period. Since 1992 frequency allocations, allotment and assignments are in line to NATO Joint Civil/Military Frequency Agreement.
However, in order to identify military radio spectrum requirements, e.g. for crises management planning, training, Electronic warfare activities, or in military operations, this system is still in use.

NATO Radio spectrum designation

 Examples to military frequency utilisation in this particular band
HF long distance radio communications
tactical UHF radio communications
aeronautical mobile service

References 

Radio spectrum